{{Infobox professional wrestler
|name        = Alex Coughlin
|image       = 
|caption     = 
|birthname   = Alex Coughlin
|names       = Alex Coughlin
|height      = 
|weight      = 
|birth_date  = 
|birth_place = Snoqualmie, Washington
|billed      = 
|debut       = April 28, 2018
|trainer     = 
}}Alex Coughlin (born December 3, 1993), is an American professional wrestler. He is currently signed to New Japan Pro-Wrestling (NJPW), mainly competing on their American show, NJPW Strong.

Professional wrestling career
Early career (2018)
Coughlin made his debut on September 18, 2018, working mainly for his hometown promotion New York Wrestling Connection, where he was trained by Bull James.

New Japan Pro-Wrestling (2018–present)
 Young Lion (2018–2020) 
In 2018, Coughlin entered the New Japan Pro-Wrestling LA Dojo, as the first class along with Karl Fredericks and Clark Connors, training under Katsuyori Shibata. Coughlin made his in-ring debut, where he was defeated by Connors in a dark match at Fighting Spirit Unleashed. Coughlin visited Japan for the first time as a representative of the LA Dojo at the Young Lion Cup held in September 2019 and came third in the tournament along with Connors with 8 points. Over the next year, Coughlin would lose to many New Japan wrestlers and draw to his fellow young lions, which is common for young lions during their training. Whilst Fredericks and Connors achieved more success, Coughlin continued to train and lose to New Japan wrestlers, due to having less wrestling background prior to joining the Dojo. Through New Japan's partnership with other promotions, Coughlin was also able to make many appearances for Ring of Honor and Revolution Pro Wrestling. Coughlin was regularly featured on Game Changer Wrestling's Bloodsport.

 The Android (2021–Present) 
In March 2020, New Japan suspended all of its activities, due to the COVID-19 pandemic, causing American-based talent, such as Coughlin to not be able to travel to Japan. Therefore, Coughlin appeared primarily on New Japan's new American-based show NJPW Strong, where he would mainly team up with his LA Dojo teammates. Whilst, Fredericks and Connors had already graduated from being Young Lions due to winning the Young Lion Cup and the Lion's Break Crown respectively, Coughlin would start a ten-match challenge series, facing a range of competitors each week. He would lose the first 8 matches, losing to the likes of Josh Alexander, Tomohiro Ishii and even Fredericks. However, in the ninth match, he defeated J. R. Kratos, after the match Coughlin announced he had graduated as a Young Lion.

In February, Coughlin returned to the UK, continuing to make appearances for Revolution Pro Wrestling. During this time, Coughlin began using the nickname, "The Android". Also in March, the LA Dojo, which was still represented by graduates like Coughlin, Connors, and Fredericks, began a feud with All Elite Wrestling's The Factory as they fought over which was the superior wrestling developmental system. This led to Coughlin and other LA Dojo members making their debuts on the May 10 edition of AEW Dark, saving the LA Dojo’s The DKC and Kevin Knight from a post-match attack by The Factory. The following week, LA Dojo members defeated The Factory in a ten-man tag team match. On June 26, Coughlin teamed with Yuya Uemura, The DKC, and Kevin Knight on the Buy-in of AEW x NJPW: Forbidden Door in a losing effort to Max Caster and The Gunn Club's Billy Gunn, Austin Gunn and Colten Gunn.

Professional wrestling style
Coughlin's style is based on pure strength, which earned him the nickname of "The Android". He commonly utilizes suplexes and is known to deadlift opponents, even if they are larger than him.

Championships and accomplishmentsPro Wrestling Illustrated'Ranked No. 329 of the top 500 singles wrestlers in the PWI 500'' in 2022

References

External links 

New Japan Pro Wresting Profile
 

1996 births
Living people
Professional wrestlers from New York (state)
American male professional wrestlers
21st-century professional wrestlers